4thought.tv is a British documentary television program, which has aired weekdays at 7:55pm on Channel 4 since 5 July 2010.

Premise
The series consists of personal short films, in which a single speaker reflects on religious and ethical issues, and aspects of spiritual lives. The shorts challenge traditional views, and provide a platform for both scepticism and devout religious beliefs.

References

External links 

2010 British television series debuts
2010s British documentary television series
British religious television series
Channel 4 documentary series
English-language television shows